Massimo Volta (born 14 May 1987) is an Italian professional footballer who plays as a defender for Eccellenza amateurs Carpenedolo.

Club career
Volta started his career with minor league club Carpenedolo.

Sampdoria
In January 2007 Volta was signed by Sampdoria in co-ownership deal for €200,000 in -year contract. Volta spent rest of 2006–07 Serie C2 season with Carpenedolo.

Parma
During 2007–08 season Parma bought Carpenedolo's stake for €200,000. Volta spent his 2007–08 season with the third division club Foligno. In June 2008 Parma and Sampdoria renewed the co-ownership deal. Volta moved up one level again and played for Vicenza in 2008–09 Serie B. Volta also spent 2008 pre-season with the Genoese team, wearing no. 87, but left on loan on the last day of transfer window. In summer 2009 Volta signed a new five-year deal with Sampdoria, the co-ownership deal also renewed again in June 2009. In August 2009 Volta left for Serie B newcomers Cesena, where he was one of the main protagonists of the club's rise into the top flight.

Return to Sampdoria
In June 2010 Sampdoria and Parma agreed to renew the co-ownership agreement again, with Volta joining the Blucerchiati for the new season. In summer 2010 he signed a new five-year contract again with Samp. He made his debut with Sampdoria in the Third Qualifying Round of the 2010–11 UEFA Champions League against Werder Bremen. That season he rotated with Stefano Lucchini as the centre-back, which Volta played 6 out of 6 group stage matches of 2010–11 UEFA Europa League, and Lucchini mainly for domestic league. The other centre-back was Daniele Gastaldello.

After Sampdoria relegated, Sampdoria bought Volta outright from Parma for €900,000 in June 2011, and Lucchini was released.

Volta was a regular starter for Doria in 2011–12 Serie B. The team promoted back to Serie A just 1 season. On 31 August 2012, Volta left for Spanish club Levante UD.

Cesena (loan)
On 21 January 2013, Volta was signed by Serie B club Cesena. The loan was extended on 11 July 2013. He renewed his loan deal with Cesena again on 18 July 2014, prior to the 2014–15 Serie A.

Perugia
On 7 July 2015, Volta was sold to A.C. Perugia Calcio.

Benevento
On 24 July 2018, Volta signed to Benevento a loan with an obligation to buy.

Triestina
On 21 July 2021, he joined Serie C club Triestina.

Later years
On 5 October 2022, Volta agreed to return to boyhood club Carpenedolo, playing in the Eccellenza regional division of Lombardy.

Footnotes

References

External links

 Lega Serie B profile 

1987 births
Living people
Sportspeople from the Province of Brescia
Footballers from Lombardy
Italian footballers
Association football defenders
Serie A players
Serie B players
Serie C players
A.C. Carpenedolo players
U.C. Sampdoria players
A.S.D. Città di Foligno 1928 players
L.R. Vicenza players
A.C. Cesena players
A.C. Perugia Calcio players
Benevento Calcio players
Delfino Pescara 1936 players
U.S. Triestina Calcio 1918 players
Levante UD footballers
Italian expatriate footballers
Expatriate footballers in Spain
Italian expatriate sportspeople in Spain